The Live Anthology is a live box set by American rock band Tom Petty and the Heartbreakers. The box set was released by Reprise Records on November 23, 2009, in a number of formats, with the standard CD and download formats, composed of 48 tracks (on 4 discs).

The album's cover artwork and packaging was designed by Shepard Fairey.

Background
In an interview with Rolling Stone magazine, Petty stated he compiled live material with Mike Campbell and Ryan Ulyate from three decades of live concerts.

In 2008, Ulyate began going through Petty's live archive and created an iTunes library of 170 concerts with a total of 3,509 performances of 400 unique songs.  "I made sure Tom and Mike heard every song they ever did", Ulyate said, "And I ranked the concerts with a star system."

Throughout his career, Petty extensively documented his concerts, beginning in the late seventies. "I'm glad we did it.  I think this is one of the great live rock & roll bands.  And you really understand us once you've heard this set. It was a lot of fun to put together"

Several other songs were mixed, but did not make it to the album. "Shadow of a Doubt (A Complex Kid)", "Don't Do Me Like That" and Eddie Cochran's "Somethin' Else" performed at the Hammersmith Odeon, March 6, 1980, were released on the deluxe edition of Damn the Torpedoes.

Track listing

Standard Edition

Deluxe Edition
On November 22, 2009, prior to the release of the standard and digital formats, Best Buy stores offered an 'exclusive' "Deluxe Edition" of the box set. (Although labelled 'exclusive' to Best Buy, this set was on general release in Europe.) The deluxe edition contains the four discs in the standard edition, and includes a fifth disc of live material, two previously unreleased DVDs, a vinyl remastering of the 1977 promotional EP Official Live 'Leg (recorded December 12, 1976), and a Blu-ray Disc featuring all 62 songs from the five CD's in the box set in 5.1 multi-channel 96K 24-bit audio. The packaging for this edition also includes a concert poster, backstage pass reproductions, a deluxe booklet, a lithograph and more bonus materials.

DVD: 400 Days, a documentary shot during the recording and tour for the album Wildflowers.

Personnel
Tom Petty and the Heartbreakers
Tom Petty (1976-2007) – lead vocals, rhythm guitar, lead guitar, harmonica, percussion, keyboards on "Luna" (Official Live 'Leg)
Mike Campbell (1976-2007) – lead guitar, mandolin, Marxophone
Benmont Tench (1976-2007) – piano, keyboards, backing vocals
Scott Thurston (1993–2006) – backing vocals, rhythm guitar, keyboards, harmonica
Ron Blair (1976–1981, 2002–2007) – bass guitar, backing vocals
Howie Epstein (1982–2001) – bass guitar, backing vocals, co-lead vocal on "Something In The Air"
Stan Lynch (1976–1993) – drums, percussion, backing vocals
Steve Ferrone (1995–2006) – drums, percussion

Additional musicians
Phil Jones– percussion (1981–1983)
The Big Money Orchestra, arranged and conducted by Jon Brion – strings and horns on "Dreamville", strings on "Like a Diamond"
David Hoskot – percussion on "My Life/Your World"
Stevie Nicks – backing vocals on "Learning to Fly"
Bobby Valentino – violin on "Louisiana Rain"
Del Shannon – rhythm guitar and backing vocal on "Breakdown" (1978 New Year's Eve concert DVD)
Phil Seymour – backing vocal on "Breakdown" (1978 New Year's Eve concert DVD)

Production

 Chris Bellman – mastering
 Mike Campbell – producer
 Shepard Fairey – artwork
 Tom Petty – producer
 Ryan Ulyate – producer, mixer
Michael Zagaris - booklet photography

References

External links
 

Tom Petty live albums
2009 live albums
2009 compilation albums
Warner Records live albums
Warner Records compilation albums
Warner Records video albums
2009 video albums
Rockumentaries
Albums with cover art by Shepard Fairey
Tom Petty video albums
Live video albums
Tom Petty compilation albums